The Woman in Black is a 1987 stage play, adapted by Stephen Mallatratt. The play is based on the 1983 book of the same name by English author Susan Hill. The play is currently being produced by PW Productions, led by Peter Wilson. It is notable for only having three actors perform the whole play. It was first performed at the Stephen Joseph Theatre in Scarborough, in 1987. The production opened in London's West End in 1989 and performed there until 4 March 2023, becoming the second longest-running non-musical play in West End history, after The Mousetrap.

Plot summary

Act I
In an empty Victorian theatre, an old Arthur Kipps is reading aloud from a manuscript of his story. A young actor, whom he hired to help dramatise the tale, enters and criticises him for his rigid delivery. After a debate, they agree to perform the story, with the Actor playing a younger Kipps, and Kipps himself playing all the other characters and narrating the play. 

Young Kipps learns of the death of the elderly and reclusive widow, Mrs. Drablow.  He travels to Crythin Gifford to sort through her private papers. On the train, he meets a local landowner, Mr. Samuel Daily, who tells him a little about Mrs. Drablow. Upon their arrival at Crythin Gifford, Mr. Daily drops off Arthur at the local inn where he is to stay the night.

The next morning, young Arthur meets with a local man enlisted to help him, Mr. Horatio Jerome. They go to Mrs. Drablow's funeral together, where Arthur first sees the Woman in Black. At first feeling sympathy for the young woman, who was apparently suffering from a wasting disease, he asks Mr. Jerome who she is. Mr. Jerome is visibly uncomfortable and forces Arthur away from the church, insisting that there was no woman. After their return to the inn, Mr. Jerome's mood lifts and says that a local man will arrive shortly to escort Arthur to Mrs. Drablow's house.

The local man, a villager named Keckwick, arrives a few moments later. To Arthur's delight, Keckwick drives Arthur in an old-fashioned pony and trap out to the house. Arthur spends the day sorting through Mrs. Drablow's papers and is amazed to find out how many there are. He also finds an old cemetery outside the house, where he again encounters the Woman in Black. Later that day, a thick fog settles on the marsh, cutting Arthur off from the mainland. He tries to return across the causeway on foot in the fog, but quickly becomes lost and is forced to retrace his steps to Eel Marsh House. Before he gets there, he hears the sound of a pony and trap on the causeway. 

Assuming that it is Keckwick returning, he turns back into the fog. It soon becomes apparent that the pony and trap are in trouble, and he hears it drive off the causeway onto the marsh. Arthur listens helplessly as the pony and trap get stuck in the mire and its occupants, including a young child, are drowned. Arthur returns to the house in a state of panic. Whilst he is exploring the house, he discovers a locked door. Due to stress, he becomes enraged when he is unable to open it. He is surprised when Keckwick returns a few hours later.

Act I ends with a monologue from young Arthur in which he explains that he is sure, although he does not know how, that the sounds he heard were from neither Keckwick nor any living thing, but from things that are dead.

Act II
Arthur seeks the help of Mr. Jerome, either to accompany him back to Eel Marsh House or to send him someone else to help. Mr. Jerome becomes severely distressed and insists that nobody in the village would willingly accompany him to the house. Arthur later meets Sam Daily and tells him of his experiences. Sam is concerned and invites Arthur to his house, where he gives Arthur his dog, Spider, as a companion. 

Returning to Eel Marsh House, Arthur finds that the locked room is a child's nursery, abandoned but in perfect condition. Later that night, he hears a knocking sound in the nursery. He and Spider investigate. The nursery has been ransacked, and an empty rocking chair is rocking back and forth as if somebody had just left it. Arthur gingerly returns to his bedroom.

The next day, Arthur finds correspondence from almost sixty years ago, between Mrs. Drablow and a mysterious woman who is apparently her sister. The woman, Jennet Humfrye, unmarried and with child, was sent away by her family. A son was born to her in Scotland, and her family immediately pressured her to give him up for adoption. Despite her strong resistance, Jennet ultimately relented and gave the child to Mrs. Drablow and her husband.

Unable to accept being parted from her son, Jennet returned to Crythin Gifford after a time and stayed with her sister. She was allowed to see her son provided that she never reveal her true relationship to him. The child became attached to Jennet. She planned to run away with him, but before she could follow through the plan, a tragic event occurred. The child, his nursemaid, and his dog went out onto the marsh one day in a pony and trap driven by Keckwick's father. A fog suddenly descended upon the marsh and they became lost. Riding blindly, they became stuck in the quicksand, and all were drowned. Jennet, driven insane by grief, contracted a terrible wasting disease and died several years later. Immediately after her death, she returned as the Woman in Black.

Arthur suddenly becomes victim to a series of chilling events in Eel Marsh House and eventually passes out on the marsh when trying to rescue Spider. He is found and taken back to Crythin by Sam Daily, who assures him that Spider survived. He tells Arthur the story of the Woman and explains that many of the local people he has met (Jerome, Keckwick, and Daily himself) have all lost a child after seeing her.

Kipps returns to London and marries his fiancée, Stella. At a country fair, Stella and their infant son Joseph go for a ride on a pony and trap. Arthur sees the Woman in Black step in front of the trap, scaring the pony. Joseph is thrown from the trap and hits a tree, killing him instantly. Stella dies 10 months later due to injuries sustained in the accident.

Having come to the end of their rehearsal, Kipps and the Actor sit down to rest. Kipps wonders if performing the play for his family will exorcise the spirit of the Woman in Black. The Actor asks Kipps about the "pale young lady with the wasted face" playing the Woman in Black. Mirroring the earlier scene with Mr. Jerome, Kipps reveals that nobody else had been in the theatre but them, implying that the real Woman in Black had been present. Remembering his own wife and child, the Actor runs offstage in horror.

Production history
The play premiered in 1987 at the Stephen Joseph Theatre in Scarborough as a "Christmas ghost story".

The play opened in the West End at the Lyric Hammersmith in January 1989, then moved to the Strand Theatre in February 1989 and subsequently transferred to the Playhouse in April 1989 and finally the Fortune Theatre in August 1989. Direction was by Robin Herford, the Set Designer was Michael Holt and the Lighting Designer was Kevin Sleep.  The original London cast (1989) was Charles Kay as Arthur Kipps and John Duttine as The Actor. In publicity literature, the actress in the title role is surreptitiously listed as 'Vision', but was originally Bristol Old Vic Theatre School-trained Nicola Sloane. For the 30th Anniversary year the West End cast from May 2018-March 2019 was Richard Hope as Arthur Kipps and Mark Hawkins as the Actor, then from 19 March 2019 Stuart Fox with Matthew Spencer.  

Following the closure of the theatre due to the COVID-19 pandemic in the United Kingdom, the show reopened on 15 September 2021 and saw both Terence Wilton and Max Hutchinson returning to play respectively Arthur Kipps and The Actor. 
As of November 2022, Julian Forsyth now plays Arthur Kipps with Matthew Spencer still playing the Actor.

On 9 November 2022, it was announced that the show would play its last performance at the Fortune Theatre on Saturday 4 March 2023.

References

External links
 Official Website
 Susan Hill Website

1987 plays
Plays based on novels
West End plays
British plays
Horror plays
Two-handers